This is a list of Landskrona BoIS season results throughout history.

Season results

Playoff results

Cup results

European participations

Svenska Cupen

Distriktsmästerskapet

References